Olaf Schenk is a German mathematician and computer scientist. He is full professor of the faculty of Informatics at the Università della Svizzera italiana (USI) in Lugano, and external lecturer of the Department of Mathematics at ETH Zurich. Schenk is a senior member of scholar associations as IEEE, and ACM. His research interests are inherent to the field of High-performance computing, in particular to the development and optimization of algorithms and software tools to perform large-scale simulations. One of his main contribution is the PARDISO project, a software tool for solving large-scale sparse matrices. He is the co-director of the Institute of Computing and of the Master of Science in Computational Science at USI.

References

External links 

Living people
Academic staff of the University of Lugano
Academic staff of ETH Zurich
German computer scientists
German academics
Year of birth missing (living people)